Feretia is a genus of flowering plants in the family Rubiaceae. The genus is found in tropical and southern Africa.

Species
Feretia aeruginescens 
Feretia apodanthera 
Feretia virgata

References

 
Rubiaceae genera